Fortum Oyj is a Finnish state-owned energy company located in Espoo, Finland. It mainly focuses on the Nordic region. Fortum operates power plants, including co-generation plants, and generates and sells electricity and heat. The company also sells waste services such as recycling, reutilisation, final disposal solutions and soil remediation and environmental constructions services, and other energy-related services and products e.g. consultancy services for power plants and electric vehicle charging. Fortum is listed on the NASDAQ OMX Helsinki stock exchange.

In 2020 Fortum was the biggest company in Finland by its revenue. The majority of its income came from Uniper that became Fortum's subsidiary in March 2020. Fortum is Europe's third-largest producer of carbon-free electricity, Europe's second-largest producer of nuclear power and one of the largest gas suppliers.

History

Imatran Voima (1932–1997)
The predecessor of Fortum was Imatran Voima (IVO), which was founded in 1932 to operate the Imatrankoski hydroelectric power plant in Imatra.

The construction of the Imatra power plant began already in 1922 as well as the power lines from Imatra to Helsinki and the power plant was opened in May 1929. Finnish Government made a decision to establish Imatran Voima Osakeyhtiö (IVO) in May 1932.

Imatran Voima acquired and built a number of other power plants, such as the largest hydroelectric power plants along the Oulujoki river, Ingå and Naantali coal-fired powerplants and the Loviisa nuclear power plant.

In 1997, a merger agreement was made between Neste and IVO.

1998–2010
Fortum Corporation was founded in 1998. It was created from the merging of Imatran Voima and Neste Oy, the Finnish national oil company.

In 2003, Fortum bought parts of Fredrikstad Energi and Fredrikstad Energi Nett in a swap deal with E.ON.

In 2005 most of Neste's assets were divested into a separate stock-listed company Neste Oil.

In 2007, Fortum acquired 25.66% stake in TGK-1, operating in northwest Russia. In 2008, Fortum privatized the natural gas, power and heat generation company TGK-10, operating in central and northern Russia.

2011–present
In 2011, Fortum sold its 25% stake in the Finnish transmission system operator Fingrid. In December 2013 Fortum announced the sale of its distribution network in Finland to Suomi Power Networks (later named Caruna), owned by First State Investments (40%), Borealis Infrastructure (40%), Keva (12,5%) and LähiTapiola (7,5%).

In 2012, Fortum shared the number one position in the Carbon Disclosure Project's Nordic climate index.

In June, Fortum acquired a 5 MW solar power plant in the state of Rajasthan in India. In September Fortum signed an agreement with Rosatom and British Rolls-Royce Engines to develop nuclear power.

In 2014 Fortum sold its Norwegian electricity distribution network and also its stakes in Fredrikstad Energi and Fredrikstad Energi Nett to the Hafslund Group. The heat business was sold to iCON Infrastructure Partners II, L.P. fund. Since 2015 the electrical distribution network in Sweden is owned by Ellevio.

In 2015 Fortum connected its first greenfield solar park, under the Jawaharlal Nehru National Solar Mission (JNNSM) Phase II initiative, in Madhya Pradesh.

In 2015, Fortum completed the divestment of its electricity distribution network in Sweden, thus completing the divestment of electricity distribution business. In 2016, Fortum acquired Grupa DUON S.A, an electricity and gas sales company in Poland, and Ekokem Corporation, a leading Nordic circular economy company specialised in material and waste recycling, final disposal solutions, soil remediation and environmental construction.

In 2017, the 100 MW plant in Pavagada solar park was connected to the grid. It was the first of a series of planned gigawatt-scale plants facilitated by reverse auctions in India. In September, Fortum announced it would buy E.ON's 47% stake in German power company Uniper. Fortum increased its stake to 75% in spring 2020. Uniper mainly uses oil, natural gas and coal to supply electricity.

In 2020 Fortum and Kværner informed that they would cooperate on a Carbon capture and storage project for waste incineration at Klemetsrud energigjenvinningsanlegg.

In 2021 Fortum sold its business in Estonia, Latvia and Lithuania to Partners Group.

Operations

Hydropower

Hydropower is one of the most significant renewable electricity production form for Fortum. In 2021 Fortum owned or co-owned over 150 hydropower plants in Finland and Sweden, including power plants on the Dalälven, Indalsälven and Ljusnan rivers in central Sweden and on the Oulujoki, Kemijoki and Vuoksi rivers in Finland.

Nuclear power

In 2021 Fortum owned the nuclear power plant in Loviisa, Finland. Its nuclear assets also cover Sweden with a 43% share ownership in the Oskarshamn Nuclear Power Plant and 22% of three Forsmark Nuclear Power Plants. Furthermore, Fortum owns a 27% stake in the Teollisuuden Voima, which operates two nuclear power plants at Olkiluoto.

Combined production of heat and electric power (cogeneration or CHP) 

Fortum produces and sells heat in Nordic countries, Russia and Poland, with 26 plants combining production of heat (district heating) and electric power. Fortum is the 5th largest heat producer globally.

Electricity and heat sales
Fortum sells electricity, electricity products and services to 1.3 million customers in Sweden, Finland, Norway and Poland. In 2014, Fortum closed its 1,000 MW coal power plant at Ingå (Finland) and demolished it in 2020.

Solar power
The company has stated that its ambition is to build a small photo-voltaic solar portfolio to gain experience in different solar technologies and in operating in the Indian power market. Fortum also sells solar power kits in the Nordic countries.

Recycling and waste solutions
Fortum provides environmental management and material efficiency services in the Nordics. Services include recycling, reutilisation, and final disposal solutions, as well as soil remediation and environmental construction services.

Environmental record 
In 2014 Fortum had the biggest market share of ecolabeled electricity in Finland. With three hydropower plants, seven biomass plants and four wind parks the company had also more EKOenergy certified power stations than any other company in Finland.

After acquiring a majority stake in Uniper in 2020, Fortum will become one of the EU's worst emitters of greenhouse gas emissions, asserted a report backed by major European environmental groups in 2019. Extinction Rebellion Finland accused Fortum for greenwashing for continuing and scaling up its fossil fuel business, for example opening (through Uniper) Dateln4 coal-fired power plant in Germany in 2020 and suing the Netherlands on the basis of the Energy Charter Treaty for banning coal.

Fortum intends to be carbon neutral by 2050 at the latest, and by 2035 for its European production. The work began in Espoo, where the use of coal was reduced. In Germany, the Hayden power plant was closed at the end of 2020. By the end of 2025, 75% of Germany's coal capacity will be closed. The Dutch coal-fired power plant will be closed by the end of 2029. Datteln 4 from Germany will be the last plant to be closed, by 2038. According to Finnish Greenpeace, the changes are made too slowly as it would like all the plants to be closed already by 2030. Fortum is planning to replace the coal capacity by new wind and solar power. Hydropower and nuclear power operations are also being developed and in Russia renewable energy is taken into use.

Social responsibility 
In February 2014, Fortum equipped three schools with solar-powered infrastructure in Bhilwara, India, where they had a solar plant.

Uniper divestment 

On 21 September 2022, Fortum announced that Uniper is to be fully divested to the German state. Under the agreement, Uniper plans to issue 4.7 billion new ordinary registered shares, which the German State plans to subscribe at a nominal value of EUR 1.70 per share. The German state-owned KfW bank will provide Uniper with additional liquidity support as required until this EUR 8 billion capital increase is completed.

At completion of the capital increase, the German State plans to buy all of Fortum‘s approximately 293 million shares in Uniper for EUR 1.70 per share, i.e. for a total of EUR 0.5 billion. At that point, change of control clause in the financing agreement will be triggered and the German State will provide the financing for the redemption of Fortum’s EUR 4 billion shareholder loan granted to Uniper and the release of the EUR 4 billion parent company guarantee.

The parties have also agreed that Fortum will have a right of first offer in case Uniper intends to divest all or parts of its Swedish hydro and nuclear assets until the end of 2026.

See also

 Energy in Finland

References

External links

 
Companies based in Espoo
Companies listed on Nasdaq Helsinki
Electric power companies of Norway
Electric power companies of Sweden
Electric power companies of Russia
Electricity retailers in Sweden
Nuclear power companies of Finland
Nuclear power companies of Sweden
Energy companies established in 1998
Finnish companies established in 1998
Government-owned energy companies
Government-owned companies of Finland